Elections were held in Middlesex County, Ontario on October 24, 2022 in conjunction with municipal elections across the province.

Middlesex County Council
Middlesex County Council consists of the mayors of each municipality (except Newbury) plus the deputy mayors of the municipalities with over 5,000 electors.

Adelaide Metcalfe

Mayor
Susan Clarke was elected mayor of Adelaide Metcalfe by acclamation.

Lucan Biddulph

Mayor
The following were the results mayor of Lucan Biddulph. Mayor Cathy Burghardt-Jesson was challenged by political newcomer Allan Cunningham.

Middlesex Centre
The following were the results for mayor and deputy mayor of Middlesex Centre.

Mayor

Deputy mayor

Newbury

Mayor

North Middlesex
The following were the results for mayor and deputy mayor of North Middlesex.

Mayor

Deputy mayor

Southwest Middlesex
The following were the results for mayor and deputy mayor of Southwest Middlesex.

Mayor

Deputy mayor

Strathroy-Caradoc
The following were the results for mayor and deputy mayor of Strathroy-Caradoc.

Mayor

Deputy mayor

Thames Centre
The following were the results for mayor and deputy mayor of Thames Centre.

Mayor

Deputy mayor

References

Middlesex
Middlesex County, Ontario